13 chansons décadentes et fantasmagoriques is the first album by experimental French singer Brigitte Fontaine, released in 1966 on the Productions Jacques Canetti label. Fontaine has disowned the album, which she states is merely a "draft" compared to her later works.

Track listing 
All songs by Brigitte Fontaine.

References 

1966 debut albums
Brigitte Fontaine albums